Stealing Fire may refer to:
 Stealing Fire (Bruce Cockburn album), 1984
 Stealing Fire (Boy Hits Car album), 2011

See also
Theft of fire